The 1936 German Grand Prix was a Grand Prix motor race held at the Nürburgring on 26 July 1936.

Classification

References

German Grand Prix
German Grand Prix
Grand Prix